Granja Julieta is a train station on ViaMobilidade Line 9-Emerald, located in Chácara Santo Antônio neighbourhood, district of Santo Amaro in São Paulo.

History
Granja Julieta is a station opened on 4 May 2000, and integrated Jurubatuba Branch, in the old Sorocaba Railway, built between 1952 and 1957. In 2001, the average passenger circulation was of 3,200 people.

Characteristics
The station has advanced architectural drawing, with project based in modules, catwalk over Via Professor SImão Faiguenboim, boarding mezzanine, elevators for people with disabilities, access ramp, rubber floor, cover, and maps with street and location of points of interest.

References

Railway stations opened in 2000